Saunra Khal is a village in Bhardar Patti, a part of Rudraprayag district in the state of Uttarakhand, India. Neighbouring habitations are Kafna and Dungra villages in the east, Syanri, Bhyonta and Rudernath Danda in the west, Timli village in the north, and Satni in the south.

Villages in Rudraprayag district